Adam Holmes (born July 31, 1967) is a member of the Ohio House of Representatives, representing the 97th district since 2019.  A Republican, Holmes' district includes Guernsey County and the majority of Muskingum County.  A graduate of the United States Naval Academy, Holmes previously served in the United States Marine Corps.  He currently is the CEO of a mechanical and industrial contracting company in Zanesville, Ohio.

In 2019, state Representative Brian Hill was appointed to the Ohio Senate, creating a vacancy in the 97th district.  Soon after it was announced that Holmes was chosen by Ohio House Republicans to fill the vacancy and serve out the remainder of Hill's term. He was sworn into office on February 6, 2019.

References

Links 
 Representative Adam Holmes (official site)

1967 births
Living people
Republican Party members of the Ohio House of Representatives
21st-century American politicians
United States Naval Academy alumni
University of San Diego alumni